Hans Henrik Scheel  (born 22 September 1956) is a Norwegian social economist and civil servant.

Early life and education
Scheel graduated from the University of Oslo in 1985.

Career
Scheel served as director of the Statistics Norway from 2011 to 2015.

Other activities
 International Monetary Fund (IMF), Ex-Officio Alternate Member of the Board of Governors

References

1956 births
Living people
Norwegian economists
Norwegian civil servants
University of Oslo alumni
Directors of government agencies of Norway